Pelėdnagiai (formerly) is a village in Kėdainiai district municipality, in Kaunas County, in central Lithuania. According to the 2011 census, the village had a population of 1016 people. Roads to Kėdainiai, Babtai, Jonava, Šeduva go next to Pelėdnagiai. There are kindergarten, library, culture house, cemetery. The Pelėdnagiai Botanical Sanctuary is located nearby.

History
The name derives from the Lithuanian word pelėdnagis (literally 'one with owl's claws') which means 'ham-fisted, dummy'. 

Pelėdnagiai has been known since 1659. There was the Pelėdnagiai manor (some of its buildings are still present nearby the Nevėžis river) and watermill. During the Soviet era Pelėdnagiai largely developed as it was a central settlement of Kėdainiai forestry farm and an administration of the Directorate of Land Development and Building.

Demography

Notable people
Vytautas Koncevičius (1941–1991), one of the 13 January Events victims, lived in Pelėdnagiai before his death.

Images

References

Villages in Kaunas County
Kėdainiai District Municipality